Mia Griffin (born 30 December 1998) is an Irish professional racing cyclist, who currently rides for UCI Women's Continental Team . She rode in the women's team pursuit event at the 2020 UCI Track Cycling World Championships in Berlin, Germany.

References

External links
 

1998 births
Living people
Irish female cyclists
Place of birth missing (living people)
Sportspeople from County Kilkenny